Monaragala is a town located in Monaragala District, Uva Province, Sri Lanka.

See also 
 List of towns in Sri Lanka
 Monaragala District
 Uva Province

References

External links 
 Office of the Governor - Uva / ඌව පලාත් ආණ්ඩුකාරවර කාර්යාලය  

 
Towns in Uva Province
Monaragala DS Division